Michele Lepore-Hagan (born April 4, 1955) is the Representative of the 58th district of the Ohio House of Representatives. She defeated three other opponents in the Democratic primary to take the nomination. She is married to Bob Hagan, who served in the Ohio General Assembly for 28 years.  When Bob Hagan was term-limited in 2014 from running for another term, Lepore-Hagan entered the race to succeed him.

Prior to running for the seat, Lepore-Hagan worked for Youngstown State University as the Director for the university's performing arts series.  She also lived in New York City for a time as an aspiring performer.  She is a graduate of Ohio University.

Lepore-Hagan was unopposed in the general election.

Controversy 
In 2020, a representative from the Youngstown-based African Education Party, claimed that Lepore-Hagan made racist remarks regarding House Bill 70.

References

Links
Official campaign site

1955 births
Living people
21st-century American politicians
21st-century American women politicians
Democratic Party members of the Ohio House of Representatives
Ohio University alumni
Politicians from Youngstown, Ohio
Women state legislators in Ohio